Iris M. Zavala (27 December 1936 – 10 April 2020) was a Puerto Rican author, scholar, and poet, who later lived in Barcelona, Spain. She had over 50 works to her name, plus hundreds of articles, dissertations, and conferences and many of her writings, including "Nocturna, mas no funesta", build on and express this belief.

She died from COVID-19 in Madrid during COVID-19 pandemic in Spain, at the age of 83.

Early years 
Zavala was born on 27 December 1936 in Ponce, Puerto Rico. She graduated from the University of Puerto Rico with a B.A. in literature and from the University of Salamanca with a "Licenciatura" degree as well as a "Doctor en Filosofía y Letras" (Ph.D.).  There, she was influenced by Spain's Fernando Lázaro Carreter.

Career
Zavala taught in Puerto Rico, México, United States, Netherlands, Italy, Germany, and Spain. In Spain she was a UNESCO fellow at the University Pompeu Fabra in Barcelona, and a Ramon Llull fellow at the University of the Balearic Islands in Mallorca. Zavala taught in many universities in the United States, including the University of Minnesota.

She was also a literary critic and essayist. In 1980, she wrote her masterpiece, "Kiliagonía", a Ponce city novel. Her second novel was "Nocturna, mas no funesta" (1987), published by Montesinos (Barcelona, Spain). It was adapted for a theatrical interpretation by Group Alcores (Madrid).  Other works include "El libro de Apolonia o de las Islas" and "El sueño del amor".

Books
Following is a list of the publications by Zavala:
1963
          1. Unamuno y su teatro de conciencia. Acta Saltmanticensia: University of Salamanca, 222 pp.
1965
          2. La angustia y el hombre. Ensayos de literatura española. México: Universidad Veracruzana, 224 pp.
          3. Barro doliente (Poetry). Santander: La Isla de los Ratones
1970
          4. La Revolución de 1868. Historia, pensamiento, literatura, ed. with Clara E. Lida. New York: Las Americas.
          5. Masones, comuneros y carbonarios. Madrid: Siglo XXI, 363 pp.
1971
          6. Ideología y política en la novela española del siglo XIX. Madrid: Anaya, 362 pp.
1972
          7. Poemas prescindibles (Poetry). New York: Anti-ediciones Villa Miseria.
          8. Románticos y socialistas. Prensa española en el siglo XIX. Madrid: Siglo XXI, 205 pp.
1973
          9. Libertad y crítica en el ensayo puertorriqueño, intr.,ed.Con R. Rodríguez. Puerto Rico: Puerto, 448 pp.
1974
          10. Escritura desatada (Poetry). Puerto Rico: Puerto.
          11. Fin de siglo:Modernismo, 98 y bohemia. Madrid: Cuadernos para el Diálogo.
1977
          12. Alejandro Sawa, Iluminaciones en la sombra, ed. estudio, notas. Madrid: Alhambra. 2@ ed.1986
1978
          13. Clandestinidad y libertinaje erudito en los albores del siglo XVIII. Barcelona: Ariel, 459 pp.
1979
          14. Historia social de la literatura española, in coll. C.Blanco Aguinaga, J. Rodríguez Puértolas. Madrid: Castalia, 3 vols. (revised ed. 1983, many reprints); reed. Madrid:Akal, 2001.
          15. Intellectual Roots of Puerto Rican Independence, coll with R. Rodríguez. New York: Monthly Review Press (revised ed. and translation of 1973)
1981
          16. El texto en la historia. Madrid: Nuestra Cultura, 259 pp.
1982
          17. Romanticismo y realismo. vol. 5 Historia y crítica de la literatura española. Barcelona: Crítica, 1982, 741pp (many reprints)
          18. Kiliagonía (novel). México: Premià (trans.Chiliagony. Indiana University: Third Woman Press, 1985)
1983
          19. Que nadie muera sin amar el mar (poetry). Madrid: Visor.
          20. El siglo XVIII, spec. issue, Nueva Revista de Filología Hispánica XXXII:1.
1984
          21. Women, Feminist Identity and Society in the 1980s, ed. Con M. Díaz-Diocaretz. Amsterdam: John Benjamins, 138 pp.
1987
          22. Lecturas y lectores del discurso narrativo dieciochesco. Amsterdam: Rodopi, 118 pp.
          23. Noctura mas no funesta (novel). Barcelona:Montesinos.
          24. Approaches to Discourse, Poetics and Psychiatry, ed. with Teun van Dijk, M. Díaz-Diocaretz. Amsterdam: John Benjamins, 235 pp.
1989
          25. Romanticismo y costumbrismo. Madrid: Espasa Calpe (Historia de España, t.35, vol. II), 183 pp.
          26. Rubén Darío bajo el signo del cisne. Universidad de Puerto Rico, 153 pp.
          27. El modernismo y otros ensayos del Rubén Darío, ed. intr.Madrid: Alianza.
1990
          28. La musa funambulesca. Poética de la carnavalización en Valle-Inclán. Madrid: Orígenes, 175 pp.
1991
          29. Unamuno y el pensamiento dialógico. M. de Unamuno y M.Bajtin. Barcelona: Anthropos, 207 pp.
          30. La posmodernidad y M. Bajtin. Una poética dialógica. Madrid: Espasa Calpe, 277 pp.
          31. El bolero. Historia de un amor (creative fiction). Madrid: Alianza, 162 pp.; reed. Aumentada y corregida, Madrid:Celeste, 2000.
1992
          32. Colonialism and Culture:Hispanic Modernisms and the Social Imaginary, Indiana University Press, 240 pp.
          33. Discursos sobre la 'invención' de América, ed. intr. Amsterdam: Rodopi.
          34. El libro de Apolonia o de las islas (novel). Puerto Rico: Instituto de Cultura.
          35. Discurso erótico y discurso transgresor en la cultura peninsular. Siglos XVI al XX, ed. with M.Díaz-Diocaretz, Madrid: Tuero, 1992.
          36. Breve historia feminista de la litertura española (en lengua castellana). 1. Teoría feminista:discursos y differencia, ed with M.Díaz-Diocaretz. Barcelona:Anthropos.
1993
          37. Historia y crítica de la literatura española. 5/1 Romanticismo y Realismo, ed. Primer Suplemento. Barcelona:Crítica.
1995
          38. Historia feminista de la literatura española (en lengua castellana). II. La mujer en la literatura española, ed. Barcelona:Anthropos, 1995.
1996
          39. Bajtin y sus apócrifos, ed. with T. Bubnova, S.Bocharov, N. Pedgorced, Amalia Rodriguez Monroy. Barcelona:Anthropos.
          40. Escuchar a Bajtin. Barcelona: Montesinos.
          41. Historia feminista de la literatura española (en lengua castellana). III. La mujer en la literatura      española (del siglo XVIII a la actualidad).ed.  Barcelona Anthropos.
1997
          42. Historia feminista de la literatura española (en lengua castellana). IV. La Literatura escrita por mujer (De la Edad Media al siglo XVIII). ed. Barcelona:Anthropos.
          43. Hacia una filosofía del acto ético. De los borradores y otros escritos, ed. Con comentarios de I. M. Zavala, Augusto Ponzio. Anthropos/Universidad de Puerto Rico.
1998
          44.El sueño del amor (novela). Universidad de Puerto Rico/Montesinos,
          45. Historia feminista de la literatura española (en lengua castellana). V. La literatura escritura por mujer (siglos XIX y XX). Anthropos/Universidad de Puerto Rico.
          46. ¿Historia o literatura?, ed. Iris M. Zavala. Núm.Esp. La Torre.
2000
          47.Feminismos, cuerpos, escrituras. ed Iris M.Zavala.La Página. Canarias
          48.El bolero. Historia de un amor,ed.Madrid: Celeste. ( 2ed. ampliada).
          49.Historia social de la literatura española(en lengua castellana)vol I-II.C. Blanco Aguinaga,Julio Rodríguez Puértolas,Iris M. Zavala.Madrid:Akal. Reedición.
          50.Breve historia feminista de la literatura española (en lengua catalana, gallega y vasca). vol.VI, ed. Iris M.Zavala. Barcelona: Anthropos.
2001
          51. El rapto de América y el síntoma de la modernidad. Barcelona:Montesinos.
2004.
          52. La otra mirada del siglo XX. La mujer en la España  del siglo XX. Madrid. La Esfera de los Libros.
2006
          53. Leer Don Quijote. 7 tesis sobre ética y literatura. Barcelona: Anthropos.
2007
          54. Percanta que me amuraste. Barcelona:Montesinos (novela)
          55. Poesía completa, Canarias:La Página.
          56. Kiliagonía.(reed).  .Canarias:La Página..
2008
          57. Alejandro Sawa. Crónicas de la bohemia. Ed. Veintisiete: Madrid.
          58. Miguel de Unamuno, ensayos heréticos. Ed. Veintisiete (en prensa).
          59. La (Di)famación de la cultura. 7 ensayos sobre ética. Ed. Veintisiete, Madrid.

Honors and awards
          Decorated by King Juan Carlos I of Spain. "Encomienda, Lazo de Dama de la Orden de Mérito Civil." 1988
          Medal of Honor, Instituto de Cultura Puertorriqueña, San Juan, Puerto Rico, April 1994.
          Doctor Honoris Causa, University of Puerto Rico, June 1996.
          Gold Medal, Ateneo Puertorriqueño. 1998.
          Cátedra UNESCO de Estudios Latinoamericanos, Universidad  Pompeu Fabra, 2001
          Honorary Doctoral degree, Universidad de Málaga. 2004.
          María Zambrano Thought Award, Junta de Andalucía.  2006.
          Pen Club Award (based on "El libro de Apolonia o de las islas").

Zavala is also honored as one of Ponce's greatest writers at the Park for Illustrious Ponce Citizens.

See also

List of Puerto Ricans

References

1936 births
2020 deaths
Puerto Rican educators
Puerto Rican writers
University of Salamanca alumni
Educators from Ponce
Writers from Ponce
Puerto Rican independence activists
20th-century Puerto Rican writers
20th-century Puerto Rican women writers
20th-century Puerto Rican educators
Puerto Rican academics
University of Puerto Rico alumni
Deaths from the COVID-19 pandemic in Spain
Puerto Rican emigrants
American emigrants to Spain
American expatriate academics
Puerto Rican expatriates in Spain
Puerto Rican activists
American women academics
20th-century women educators